Claudiu is a Romanian male given name derived from Latin Claudius. The female form is Claudia.

Notable people with the name include:
Claudiu Baștea (born 1979 ), Romanian judoka
Claudiu Belu (born 1993), Romanian footballer
Claudiu Bleonț (born 1959), Romanian film and theatre actor, comedian, television celebrity, and television presenter
Claudiu Boaru (born 1977), Romanian footballer
Claudiu Borțoneanu (born 1999), Romanian footballer
Claudiu Bumba (born 1994), Romanian footballer
Claudiu Bunea (born 1981), Romanian footballer
Claudiu David, Romanian rally driver
Claudiu Ionescu (disambiguation), several people
Claudiu Isopescu (1894–1956), Austro-Hungarian-born Romanian literary historian and translator
Claudiu Keșerü (born 1986), Romanian footballer
Claudiu Târziu (born 1973), Romanian politician and journalist

Romanian masculine given names